ISE may refer to:

Organizations
 International Society of Electrochemistry, a global scientific society founded in 1949
 Islamic Society of Engineers, principlist political organization of engineers in Iran

Education
 Iceland School of Energy, a school jointly owned by Reykjavik Energy, Reykjavik University, and Iceland GeoSurvey
 Institute for Shipboard Education, administrator of the Semester at Sea study-abroad program
 Institute for Social Ecology, an educational institution in Plainfield, Vermont
 International School Eindhoven, an international school in the northern part of Eindhoven, Netherlands
 International Student Exchange, Ontario, a non-profit organization allowing students to participate in reciprocal student exchange programs

Stock exchanges
 International Securities Exchange, a United States stock exchange
 Irish Stock Exchange, Ireland's main stock exchange
 Islamabad Stock Exchange, now Pakistan Stock Exchange
 Istanbul Stock Exchange, a former Turkish stock exchange that merged and became Borsa Istanbul

Other
 Fraunhofer Institute for Solar Energy Systems (Fraunhofer ISE), an institute of the Fraunhofer Society
 Information Sharing Environment, a United States government program
 Initiative for Science in Europe, an independent platform of European learned societies and scientific organisations
 ISE Corporation, a company that developed hybrid electric drivetrains for heavy-duty transportation
 Ion selective electrode, a transducer that converts the activity of a specific ion dissolved in a solution into an electrical potential
 Xilinx ISE, software for synthesis and analysis of hardware description language designs

See also
 Ise (disambiguation)

de:Ise